Brigadier-General Francis Leycester Festing  (25 July 1877 - 17 October 1948) was a senior officer in the Royal Flying Corps during World War I. Promoted to major on 1 September 1915, just over two years later he received a temporary promotion to brig-gen on 10 October 1917 and took up post as the Deputy Adjutant-General at the HQ of the RFC in France.

He was the son of Major-General Sir Francis Festing.

Festing married Charlotte Katharine Grindall Festing (his second cousin) and, in 1902, they had one child Francis Wogan Festing who rose to the rank of field marshal.

External links
Air of Authority - Brigadier-General F L Festing

References

Royal Flying Corps officers
British Army generals of World War I
Royal Air Force generals of World War I
Royal Northumberland Fusiliers officers
1877 births
1949 deaths
British Army personnel of the Second Boer War
Graduates of the Royal Military College, Sandhurst
People educated at Winchester College
Companions of the Order of the Bath
Companions of the Order of St Michael and St George